Alan John Bassham (3 October 1933 – 1982) was an English professional footballer who played in the Football League for Brentford as a right back.

Club career

Brentford 
Bassham began his career in the youth team at Second Division club Brentford as an inside or outside forward and was developed into a right half. He turned professional in October 1951 and was further developed into a full back, but he had to wait nearly two years to make his senior debut, which came in a 1–1 draw with Stoke City on 19 August 1953. After Brentford's relegation to the Third Division South for the 1954–55 season, Bassham made a minor breakthrough into the team and made 17 appearances. He gradually lost his place and played mostly for the reserves during his final years with the club. Bassham made 45 appearances during his time with Brentford and was given a free transfer in May 1959.

Non-League football 
After his release, Bassham joined Kent League club Folkestone Town.

International career 
Bassham won two caps for England Schoolboys at international level.

Career statistics

References

1933 births
Footballers from Kensington
English footballers
Brentford F.C. players
English Football League players
Folkestone F.C. players
Association football fullbacks
1982 deaths
Kent Football League (1894–1959) players